John Charles "Jack" Crooks (November 9, 1865 – February 2, 1918) was an American Major League Baseball infielder born in St. Paul, Minnesota. Crooks also amassed a career on-base percentage of .386 despite a Batting average of just .240, due to large part to the high walks totals he compiled.

Crooks was well known in his era as an extremely patient hitter, often fouling off many pitches until he got one that he could hit. This approach led him to draw many walks (also, "bases on balls", or BB), in fact, he held the record for walks by rookie second basemen as well, when he walked 96 times for the Columbus Solons of the American Association in 1890. He held this record until Jim Gilliam of the Brooklyn Dodgers walked 100 times in 1953. Despite hitting just .213 in 1892, he walked a league-leading 136 times put his on-base percentage (OBP) at .400, good for fifth in National League. He also became the Major League single-season record holder in that category, a title he held until Jimmy Sheckard walked 147 times in 1911.  That total remained the St Louis Browns/Cardinals single-season franchise record until 1998, when Mark McGwire walked 162 times. The next season, while batting just .237, Crooks' league-leading 121 BB put his OBP at .408. Crooks' career walk rate of 17.6% was the highest among all major leaguers between 1871 and the advent of the live-ball era in 1920.

In addition to playing for Columbus, Crooks also had stints with the Washington Senators, Louisville Colonels, and the St. Louis Browns on two occasions. During his first tenure, he was named as their player-manager, in 1892 on an interim basis twice that season.  His short managerial career produced a record of 27 wins and 33 losses, with the team finishing a distant 11th place in the National League standings.

Jack died at the age of 52 in St. Louis, Missouri and was interred at Valhalla Cemetery.

See also
 List of Major League Baseball career stolen bases leaders
 List of Major League Baseball player-managers
 List of St. Louis Cardinals team records

References

External links

1865 births
1918 deaths
Major League Baseball second basemen
Baseball players from Saint Paul, Minnesota
19th-century baseball players
Columbus Solons players
St. Louis Browns (NL) players
St. Louis Browns managers
Washington Senators (1891–1899) players
Louisville Colonels players
Minneapolis Millers (baseball) players
St. Paul Saints (Northwestern League) players
Omaha Omahogs players
Omaha Lambs players
Columbus Senators players
Columbus Buckeyes (minor league) players
Buffalo Bisons (minor league) players
St. Paul Saints (Western League) players
Major League Baseball player-managers
St. Louis Whites players